Radovan Đoković (born 26 March 1996) is a Serbian professional basketball player for Mornar of the ABA League and the Montenegrin League.

Playing career 
On 4 August 2022, Đoković signed one-year contract extension with Borac Čačak. On 19 December 2022, he parted ways with Borac.

References

External links 
 Profile at aba-liga.com
 Profile at beobasket.net
 Profile at FIBA

1996 births
Living people
ABA League players
Basketball League of Serbia players
Guards (basketball)
KK Borac Čačak players
KK FMP players
KK Jagodina players
KK Mega Basket players
KK Napredak Kruševac players
KK Tamiš players
OKK Beograd players
Serbian men's basketball players